University Hills may refer to:
University Hills, Irvine, California
University Hills, Los Angeles, California
University Hills, one of the neighborhoods of Denver, Colorado
University Hills, one of the neighborhoods of Baton Rouge, Louisiana
University Hills, a trailer park in Starkville, Mississippi, damaged by Hurricane Rita
University Hills, a dig site at Agate Fossil Beds National Monument, Nebraska
University Hills, one of the neighborhoods of Toledo, Ohio
University Hills, a ZIP code in Caloocan, Philippines